Chahar Bid (also Romanized as ChahārBīd)
Province]], Iran. At the 2006 census, its population was 1,546, in 416 families.

References 

Populated places in Jajrom County